The Seonso Conglomerate is a Cretaceous aged geologic formation in South Korea. Fossil of Asprosaurus, Koreanosaurus and dinosaur eggs have been reported from the formation.

See also 
 List of dinosaur-bearing rock formations
 List of stratigraphic units with dinosaur trace fossils
 Dinosaur eggs

References

Bibliography 

Geologic formations of South Korea
Upper Cretaceous Series of Asia
Cretaceous South Korea
Campanian Stage
Santonian Stage
Conglomerate formations
Sandstone formations
Mudstone formations
Alluvial deposits
Fluvial deposits
Ooliferous formations
Fossiliferous stratigraphic units of Asia
Paleontology in South Korea